Sameh Alaa is an Egyptian film director. Born in Cairo, he studied at Cairo University, when he then moved to Europe. In 2020, he became the first Egyptian director to have a film screened in the Short Film Competition section at the Cannes Film Festival. The film, I'm Afraid to Forget Your Face, went on to win the Short Film Palme d'Or at the 2020 Cannes Film Festival, becoming the first Egyptian film to win the Short Film Palme d'Or. In June 2021, he was named as one of the six jury members for the Cinéfondation and short films section at the 2021 Cannes Film Festival.

References

External links

Year of birth missing (living people)
Living people
Film directors from Cairo